Goritsy is a rural locality (a village) in Pogarsky District, Bryansk Oblast, Russia. The population was 59 as of 2013. There are 3 streets.

Geography 
Goritsy is located 25 km south of Pogar (the district's administrative centre) by road. Chausy is the nearest rural locality.

References 

Rural localities in Pogarsky District